Barbie Beach Vacation is a 2001 action-adventure video game within the Barbie franchise, developed by Krome Studios and published by Vivendi Universal Interactive Publishing. The game was noted for including "wonderful and pleasant" gaming aspects as a counterpoint to the more violent gameplay of contemporary male-targeted action titles.

References 

2001 video games
Action video games
Barbie video games
Krome Studios games
Single-player video games
Video games developed in Australia
Windows games
Windows-only games
Works about vacationing